Vecino is the surname of:
 Matías Vecino (born 1991), Uruguayan footballer
 Mercedes Vecino (1916–2004), Spanish actress
 Santiago Vecino (born 1978), Uruguayan illustrator
 Thiago Vecino (born 1999), Uruguayan footballer
 Lara Arruabarrena Vecino (born 1992), Spanish tennis player

See also
 Vecinos (disambiguation)